Roger Ward Babson (July 6, 1875 – March 5, 1967) was an American entrepreneur, economist, and business theorist in the first half of the 20th century. He is best remembered for founding Babson College. He also founded Webber College, now Webber International University, in Babson Park, Florida, and the defunct Utopia College, in Eureka, Kansas.

Babson was born to Nathaniel Babson and his wife Ellen Stearns as part of the 10th generation of Babsons to live in Gloucester, Massachusetts. Roger attended Massachusetts Institute of Technology and worked for investment firms before founding Babson's Statistical Organization (1904), which analyzed stocks and business reports; it continues today as Babson-United, Inc.

On March 29, 1900, Babson married his first wife, Grace Margaret Knight, who died in 1956. In 1957, he married Nona M. Dougherty, who died in 1963. Babson died in 1967.

Work on financial theory 
Babson's success as an investor was based on unorthodox views of the operation of markets. According to his biographer John Mulkern, Babson attributed the business cycle "to Sir Isaac Newton's law of action and reaction... (with a) pseudoscientific notion that gravity can be used to explain movement in the stock markets." His market forecasting techniques are expounded in articles in Traders World Magazine and the Gravity Research Foundation he founded.

He graduated from MIT with a degree in engineering. As a college student, he lobbied the dean to include a business course, which resulted in a course known as "Business Engineering." Eventually, the business engineering program was expanded, and it is now seen as the forerunner of the MBA degree.

Babson authored more than 40 books on economic and social problems, the most widely read being Business Barometers (eight editions) and Business Barometers for Profits, Security, Income (10 editions). Babson also wrote hundreds of magazine articles and newspaper columns. He was a popular lecturer on business and financial trends.

Babson was an investor and sometimes director of many corporations, including some traded on the New York Stock Exchange. He established the investment advisory company Babson's Reports, which published one of the first investment newsletters in the U.S.

Babson's Ten Commandments of Investing 
Babson had "Ten Commandments" he followed in investing and encouraged his readers to do the same. These were:
 Keep speculation and investments separate.
 Don't be fooled by a name.
 Be wary of new promotions.
 Give due consideration to market ability.
 Don't buy without proper facts.
 Safeguard purchases through diversification.
 Don't try to diversify by buying different securities of the same company.
 Small companies should be carefully scrutinized.
 Buy adequate security, not super abundance.
 Choose your dealer and buy outright (don't buy on margin).

On September 5, 1929, he gave a speech in which he proclaimed, "Sooner or later a crash is coming, and it may be terrific." Later that day, the stock market declined by about 3%. This became known as the "Babson Break." The Wall Street Crash of 1929 and the Great Depression soon followed.

Role in development of Andrews Pitchfork 
Babson learned to draw a nominal line through zigzagging market action on charts from George F. Swain, a Professor of Engineering, when he worked with him, and he later taught this technique to Alan H. Andrews, who further refined it into "Andrews Pitchfork," a now-commonly used trendline indicator.

Political career 
Babson was the Prohibition Party's candidate for President of the United States in 1940. The election was won by incumbent President Franklin Delano Roosevelt of the Democratic Party. Babson was surpassed by two other unsuccessful candidates:
 Wendell Lewis Willkie of the Republican Party
 Norman Mattoon Thomas of the Socialist Party of America

Role in development of the parking meter 
In the late 1920s, Babson filed several patents for a parking meter. The meters were suggested to operate on power from the battery of the parking vehicle and required a connection from the vehicle to the meter. In 1932, Carl Magee began to work on the parking meter and since his parking meter was the first to be installed for actual use on July 1935 in Oklahoma City, Magee is known as the inventor of the parking meter.

Establishment of the Gravity Research Foundation 
Babson founded the Gravity Research Foundation in 1948. The Foundation established a research facility in the town of New Boston, New Hampshire after Babson determined that this location was far enough away from the city of Boston, Massachusetts to survive a nuclear attack.

Interest in Isaac Newton 

Throughout Babson's life, he had a strong interest in Isaac Newton, especially after learning how "Newton had combined the practical with the theoretical," similar to how Babson applied Newton's third law to finance. Babson's wife, Grace Babson, also had a strong interest in Newton, collecting much of Newton's work in a variety of translations, editions, and commentaries over many years. At the time, it was much easier to amass a large collection of scientific writing as book collectors valued them much less than in later years. Following some financial success, Grace was able to pursue her collection even further, later amounting to over 1,000 editions of Newton materials, being the largest source in the United States. In 1995, the Babson College collection was placed on loan to MIT's Burndy Library, and in 2006, to the Huntington Library in San Marino, California, where it is available for scholarly research.

Between Sir Isaac Newton Library (now known as Tomasso Hall) and the Lunder Admission Center lay descendants of the original apple trees that had purportedly inspired Newton's idea of gravity. Grace also saved the parlor of Newton's last residence before its demolition and created a replica in Babson Park.

The "Babson Boulders" of Dogtown, Massachusetts 

Babson was interested in the history of an abandoned settlement in Gloucester known as Dogtown. To provide charitable assistance to unemployed stonecutters in Gloucester during the Great Depression, Babson commissioned them to carve inspirational inscriptions on approximately two dozen boulders in the area surrounding Dogtown Common. The Babson Boulder Trail exists today as a well-known hiking and mountain-biking trail. The inscriptions are clearly visible. The boulders are scattered, not all are on the trail, and not all of the inscriptions face it, making finding them something of a challenge. Samples of some of the two dozen inscriptions include "," "," "," "," and "."

References

Further reading

External links 
 
 
 
 biographies of several Babsons including Roger Babson
 

1875 births
1967 deaths
Economists from Massachusetts
American Congregationalists
MIT School of Engineering alumni
Massachusetts Prohibitionists
People from Gloucester, Massachusetts
Prohibition Party (United States) presidential nominees
Candidates in the 1940 United States presidential election
20th-century American politicians
Webber International University
Presidents of Babson College